Radomyśl may refer to the following places in Poland:
Radomyśl, Greater Poland Voivodeship (west-central Poland)
Radomyśl, Masovian Voivodeship (east-central Poland)
Radomyśl, Drawsko County in West Pomeranian Voivodeship (north-west Poland)
Radomyśl, Stargard County in West Pomeranian Voivodeship (north-west Poland)
Radomyśl, Szczecinek County in West Pomeranian Voivodeship (north-west Poland)
Radomyśl nad Sanem, Stalowa Wola County, Subcarpathian Voivodeship (south-eastern Poland)

Radomyšl may also refer to the following places:
Radomyšl, a village in Strakonice District in southern Bohemia
Radomyśl, Polish name of Radomyshl, a town in Ukraine